Herbert Strauss may refer to:

 Herbert A. Strauss (1918–2005), German-American historian
 Herbert D. Strauss (1909–1973), American businessman
 Herbert L. Strauss (1936–2014), German-American chemist